Joana Elena Pérez Olea (born 1 April 1976) is a Chilean politician and public administrator who currently serves as a member of the Chamber of Deputies of Chile. She also is a militant of the Christian Democratic Party.

She was one of the vicepresidents of her party.

References

External links
 BCN Profile

1976 births
Living people
Christian Democratic Party (Chile) politicians
21st-century Chilean politicians
University of Concepción alumni